Neil Affleck is a Canadian animator, director, and  actor. He has worked as an animator on The Simpsons and Family Guy. As an actor, he appeared in the 1981 film Scanners and had a leading role in the 1981 film My Bloody Valentine. He also directed animated works such as Family Guy, Miss Spider's Sunny Patch Friends, Mike the Knight, and the 2009 Doki special. He animated six episodes of Rocko's Modern Life, five episodes of The Critic and one episode of Pearlie, The Legend of Prince Valiant, and Wayside. Affleck won the Norman McLaren award for his animated film Hands.

Early life
Affleck is a native of Montreal, Quebec, Canada. He is the son of Canadian architect Raymond Affleck, who was one of the founders of the Montreal-based architectural firm, Arcop.

Career
Affleck started out as an actor, making appearances in films and TV shows, such as Wild Thing, Cross Country, Murder By Phone, Visiting Hours, Dirty Tricks, My Bloody Valentine, Scanners, Oh Heavenly Dog, and Will There Really Be a Morning?. My Bloody Valentine was his most prominent role, but the film was poorly received at the time of its release. It later gained a cult following.

After struggling to become an actor in Toronto, Affleck moved to Los Angeles in the United States and decided to become an animator. He had been mentored in animation by Norman McLaren at the National Film Board of Canada (NFB). As Affleck's visa was about to expire, a friend informed him that directors were being hired to work on The Simpsons. Affleck worked on The Simpsons from 1994 to 2007, animating 52 episodes and directing 7 of them.

Personal life
Affleck is married and has one daughter. He enjoys hockey.

Filmography

References

External links
 

Living people
Anglophone Quebec people
Artists from Montreal
Canadian animated film directors
Canadian male film actors
Film directors from Montreal
Male actors from Montreal
1953 births